Kingshuk Nag is an Indian author and editor with The Times of India and a recipient of the Prem Bhatia Award for Outstanding Political Reporting of The Year.

Life and career
Nag studied in Delhi, culminating in MA in Economics from the Delhi School of Economics in 1980.

Nag worked as a deputy editor for Business India, as an editor and PR officer for the Associated Chambers of Commerce and Industry of India, as the New Delhi reporter for the Indian Express and as a staff writer and economist for Tata Economic Consultancy Services.  Since 1993, he has worked for The Times of India.  He was its business news chief, working in Delhi and Bangalore, in which role he brought business news to the front page in the wake of economic liberalisation.  Since 2000, he has been the Resident Editor, first in Ahmedabad and then, since 2005, in Hyderabad.

In his Ahmedabad post, Nag was witness to the Bhuj earthquake, the installation of Narendra Modi as the Chief Minister and the 2002 Gujarat riots. He received the Prem Bhatia Award for Outstanding Political Reporting of The Year in 2002 for his "courageous reporting of Gujarat riots" along with reporter Bharat Desai.  By his own account, he was threatened by the Vishva Hindu Parishad chief Praveen Togadia that he would be socially boycotted if he did not "mend his ways".

Since 2005, as the Resident Editor in Hyderabad, Nag has covered events such as corporate fraud at Satyam Computers and the agitation for statehood for Telangana.

Works
 The Double Life of Ramalinga Raju : The Story of India's Biggest Corporate Fraud (2012), ASIN B008V8HGXW
Kingfizzer: The Rise and Fall of Vijay Mallya
 Battlegrond Telangana (2012), 
 The NaMo Story is a biography of Narendra Modi, which had been in conception since 2002 according to Nag, but no publishers were available to publish an unbiased biography of Modi until 2012.  Excerpts from the book have appeared in Outlook and Firstpost.
 The Saffron Tide (2014), 
 Netaji: Living Dangerously (2016) 
 Atal Bihari Vajpayee : A Man For All Seasons (2017) 
 Mohan Bhagwat: Influencer-in-Chief (2018)
 A New Silk Road: India, China and the Geopolitics of Asia (2021)

References

Living people
The Times of India journalists
2002 Gujarat riots
Indian political journalists
21st-century Indian journalists
21st-century biographers
Indian investigative journalists
Delhi School of Economics alumni
Indian political writers
Indian male novelists
Indian male journalists
Year of birth missing (living people)